Tottenham is a suburb of London, England

Tottenham may also refer to:

Places
Tottenham (UK Parliament constituency), in London, England
Municipal Borough of Tottenham, a former administrative district in England
Tottenham House, Wiltshire, England
Tottenham, New South Wales, a small town in Australia
Tottenham, Victoria, a suburb of Melbourne, Australia
Tottenham, Ontario, a small town in Canada

Other uses
Tottenham Hotspur F.C., an association football club in London
Tottenham (1802 Indiaman), a merchant ship
SS Tottenham, five British steamships in service between 1896 and 1941